John Osborne (1929–1994) was an English playwright.

John Osborne may also refer to:

John Osborne (broadcaster), radio DJ
John Osborne (footballer) (1940–1998), English football goalkeeper
John Eugene Osborne (1858–1943), American politician
John Osborne, victim of one of the last duckings for witchcraft in England, murdered by Thomas Colley 
John Osborne (journalist) (1842–1908), Australian journalist and Methodist minister
John Osborne (Montserrat politician) (1936–2011), Montserrat politician
John A. Osborne Airport in Montserrat, which is named for him
John Osborne (Australian politician) (1878–1961), New South Wales politician
John F. Osborne (1907–1981), American journalist and author, editor Time Life, New Republic
John Osborne (Medal of Honor) (1844–1920), American sailor and Medal of Honor recipient
John Osborne, 11th Duke of Leeds (1901–1963), British peer
John Osborne (singer), part of the country duo Brothers Osborne
John Osborne (writer) (born 1981), English writer and poet
John Proby Osborne (1755–1787), Irish politician
Sir John Osborne, 7th Baronet (1688–1743), Irish baronet, landowner and politician
John Osborne (barrister) (1630s–1692), English barrister and judge
John Walter Osborne (1828–1902), Irish-born Australian chemist and engineer
John Osborne Jr. (1833–1922), British jockey

John W. Osborne  (1927–2019), American historian

See also 
John Osborn (disambiguation)
Ozzy Osbourne (born 1948), singer, real name John Osbourne